McKinsey & Company is an American worldwide management consulting firm.

McKinsey may also refer to:

 McKinsey (surname), a surname
 McKinsey 7S Framework, a management model
 McKinsey Quarterly, a business magazine for senior executives
 McKinsey Award, awarded by the Harvard Business Review

See also
 McKinley (disambiguation)
 Kinsey (disambiguation)